The Sauber C32 was a Formula One racing car designed and built by the Sauber team for use in the 2013 Formula One season. It was driven by Esteban Gutiérrez in his Formula One debut alongside Nico Hülkenberg, who joined the team after racing for Force India in 2012. The car was launched on 2 February 2013.

The chassis was designed by Matt Morris, Pierre Waché and Willem Toet with the car being powered with a customer Ferrari engine.

Design
The Sauber C32 features distinct narrow sidepods which, according to designer Matt Morris, were inspired by former driver Sergio Pérez's crash at the 2011 Monaco Grand Prix. Pérez hit the barrier at the Nouvelle Chicane side-on, crushing the right-hand sidepod, which led to the team investigating whether it would be possible to incorporate narrow sidepods into a future design. This proved to be much harder than first anticipated, as the internal workings of the car had to be completely reconfigured to accommodate the slimmer design.

In comparison to its predecessor, the Sauber C31, the C32 features a lower nose design. The stepped nose concept used throughout 2012 was abandoned, and the nose was modeled to give it smooth profile. The air vent positioned forward of the cockpit in 2012 was retained.

2013 season
Esteban Gutiérrez, in his first career Grand Prix, qualified in 18th place and finished in 13th position, the highest-placed rookie. Hülkenberg started from 15th on the grid and finished in the same position, while Gutiérrez qualified 16th, but a penalty demoted him to 19th on the grid and he finished the race in  eleventh place, but the Mexican recorded the fastest lap with a time of 1:26.217 and  a speed average of 194.370 km/h (120.776 mph).

In Canada, both cars retired due to accidents, but Gutiérrez was classified 20th for having completing 90% of the race distance. Hülkenberg finished 10th in each of the next 2 races while Gutiérrez finished 14th. The next two races, the Hungarian and Belgian Grands Prix, saw the team record consecutive failures to score. However, in the Italian Grand Prix, Hülkenberg achieved a sensational third place in qualifying, and finished the race in a good fifth position. This was the best result for Hülkenberg since moving to the Sauber team at the beginning of the 2013 season, and the best result of a Sauber since Kamui Kobayashi's one and only podium finish, third place in the 2012 Japanese Grand Prix. Before it became better in Korea with 4th place while Gutiérrez equalled his best result with 11th after qualifying 7th and 8th respectively, before the next race saw both drivers finishing in the points with 6th and 7th places, but then the points-streak ended thanks to Hülkenberg's brake failure and Gutiérrez's drive-through for jumping the start. Hülkenberg ended the year with two more points finishes while Gutiérrez's seventh place in Japan ended up being the only points he scored all year.

Overall, Sauber finished 7th in the championship with 57 points, 50 of these coming in the second part of the season, a worse record than previous year’s C31, which finished 6th with 126 points and 4 podiums.

Complete Formula One results
(key) (results in bold indicate pole position; results in italics indicate fastest lap)

 Driver failed to finish the race, but was classified as they had completed greater than 90% of the race distance.

References

External links

 The official website of the Sauber F1 team
 

C32